The Yearly Meeting of Aotearoa/New Zealand (Te Hāhi Tūhauwiri) is the umbrella body and Yearly Meeting of the Religious Society of Friends in New Zealand.

Quakers have a long history of involvement in New Zealand. The Quaker Sydney Parkinson was on James Cook's first voyage; other Quakers visited or settled before the first regular Meeting for Worship in Nelson in 1843. New Zealand Friends formed a Yearly Meeting, independent of the London Yearly Meeting, in 1964.

Monthly Meetings under the care of the Yearly Meeting in New Zealand include Northern, Mid-North Island, Palmerston North, Whanganui, Taranaki, Kapiti, Wellington, Christchurch and Dunedin. In 2005 there were approximately 590 Friends in New Zealand, but about 1500 people, including children, are associated with the Society.

References

External links
Religious Society of Friends (Quakers) in New Zealand(Official Website)

Christianity in New Zealand
Quaker yearly meetings
Annual events in New Zealand